The 2017 Humboldt State Lumberjacks football team represented Humboldt State University during the 2017 NCAA Division II football season. Humboldt State competed in the Great Northwest Athletic Conference (GNAC).

The 2017 Lumberjacks were led by head coach Rob Smith in his tenth and last year at the helm. They played home games at the Redwood Bowl in Arcata, California. Humboldt State finished the season with a record of eight wins and two losses (8–2, 6–2 GNAC). The Lumberjacks averaged 42 points per game, outscoring their opponents 421–263 for the 2017 season.

In the ten years under coach Smith, Humboldt State won the conference championship twice, in 2011 and 2015. They reached the Division II playoffs after the 2015 season. The Lumberjacks were nationally ranked in six of his last seven years, 2011, 2012, 2014, 2015, 2016, and 2017. He compiled an overall record of 63–44.

Schedule

References

Humboldt State
Humboldt State Lumberjacks football seasons
Humboldt State Lumberjacks football